Rolf Berggren (born 26 November 1934 – 2007) was a Swedish ice hockey player. Berggren was part of the Djurgården Swedish champions' team of 1958, 1959, 1960, and 1961.

References

Swedish ice hockey players
Djurgårdens IF Hockey players
1934 births
2007 deaths